Martina Zedníková (born 28 March 1998) is a Czech ice hockey player for HC Příbram and the Czech national team.

She participated at the 2016 IIHF Women's World Championship.

References

External links

1998 births
Living people
Czech women's ice hockey defencemen
Sportspeople from České Budějovice